Gyrostemon subnudus is a plant in the family, Gyrostemonaceae. It was first described as Amperea subnuda in 1848 by Nees von Esenbeck, and transferred to the genus, Gyrostemon in 1873 by Henri Ernest Baillon.

It is native to the south-west of Western Australia.

Description 
Gyrostemon subnudus is a tangled, many branched shrub which grows up to 2 m. The branchlets are slender and often leafless. Old stems may be corky. The leaves are scattered and terete, and about 10-35 mm long.    There are male and female flowers which are axillary and solitary.  The orange-brown seeds  are round to oblong, and ridged.

References

External links
Gyrostemon subnudus: Occurrence data from the Australasian Virtual Herbarium

Plants described in 1848
Taxa named by Henri Ernest Baillon
Taxa named by Christian Gottfried Daniel Nees von Esenbeck
Gyrostemonaceae